Mateus Feliiano Augusto Tomás (February 23, 1958 – October 30, 2010) was the Roman Catholic bishop of the Roman Catholic Diocese of Namibe, Angola.

Tomás was born in Chinguar, Angola.  Ordained to the priesthood in 1983, he was named bishop in 2009. Tomás died in Namibe, today's Moçâmedes Angola.

Notes

1958 births
2010 deaths
21st-century Roman Catholic bishops in Angola
People from Bié Province
Roman Catholic bishops of Namibe